Prior to its uniform adoption of proportional representation in 1999, the United Kingdom used first-past-the-post for the European elections in England, Scotland and Wales. The European Parliament constituencies used under that system were smaller than the later regional constituencies and only had one Member of the European Parliament each. The constituency of Derbyshire was one of them.

When it was created in 1979, it consisted of the Westminster Parliament constituencies of Belper, Bolsover, Derby North, Derby South, Derbyshire South East, Derbyshire West, High Peak, and Ilkeston.  From 1984 until its abolition, it consisted of Amber Valley; Ashfield; Bolsover; Derby North; Derby South; Derbyshire West; Erewash; and High Peak.

MEPs

Election results

References

External links
 David Boothroyd's United Kingdom Election Results 

European Parliament constituencies in England (1979–1999)
Politics of Derbyshire
1979 establishments in England
1994 disestablishments in England
Constituencies established in 1979
Constituencies disestablished in 1994